The 2023 UAE Tour is a road cycling stage race that took place between 20 and 26 February 2023 in the United Arab Emirates. It was the fifth edition of the UAE Tour

Teams 

UCI WorldTeams

 
 
 
 
 
 
 
 
 
 
 
 
 
 
 
 

UCI ProTeams

Route

Stages

Stage 1 
20 February 2023 — Al Dhafra Castle to Al Mirfa,

Stage 2 
21 February 2023 – Khalifa Port to Khalifa Port,  (TTT)

Stage 3 
22 February 2023 – Umbrella Beach Al Fujairah to Jebel Jais,

Stage 4 
23 February 2023 – Al Shindagha to Dubai Harbour,

Stage 5 
24 February 2023 – Al Marjan Island to Umm al Quwain,

Stage 6 
25 February 2023 – Warner Bros. World Abu Dhabi to Abu Dhabi Breakwater,

Stage 7 
26 February 2023 – Hazza bin Zayed Stadium to Jebel Hafeet,

Classification leadership table

Classification standings

General classification

Points classification

Sprints classification

Young rider classification

Team classification

References

External links 
 

2023
UAE Tour
UAE Tour
UAE Tour